Dominik Záleský (born 23 August 1995) is a Czech sprinter and bobsledder.

Career
He represented his country in the 60 metres at the 2018 World Indoor Championships reaching the semifinals. He has also qualified to compete at the 2022 Winter Olympics in bobsleigh.

International competitions

1Did not start in the final

Personal bests
Outdoor
100 metres – 10.16 NR (+1.0 m/s, Zlín 2021)
200 metres – 20.94 (+1.0 m/s, Ostrava 2021)
Indoor
60 metres – 6.61 (Prague 2018)

References

External links
 at World Athletics

1995 births
Living people
Czech male sprinters
Competitors at the 2017 Summer Universiade
Competitors at the 2019 Summer Universiade
Bobsledders at the 2022 Winter Olympics
Olympic bobsledders of the Czech Republic